Rocketman (Music from the Motion Picture) is a soundtrack album released by Virgin EMI (UK) and Interscope Records (US) on CD and digital formats on 24 May 2019 and is the official soundtrack album to the 2019 biographical musical film of English musician Elton John entitled Rocketman. The album contains 22 tracks of several hits performed by the cast of the film and a newly written track "(I'm Gonna) Love Me Again" featuring vocals by Taron Egerton and John together. This is the only song featuring Elton. The song won the 2019 Golden Globe Award for Best Original Song & the 2020 Academy Award for Best Original Song. The soundtrack was also released by Interscope Records on vinyl on 23 August 2019.

Commercial success
On 7 June 2019, the album entered the Billboard 200 at number 58 and at number 6 on the Billboard Soundtracks chart. In its second week, the soundtrack moved to number 50 with 12,000 album-equivalent units.

Track listing

Personnel

 Giles Martin – production 
 Greg Kurstin – production 
 Elton John – executive production; vocals 
 Matthew Vaughn – executive production
 David Furnish – executive production
 Dexter Fletcher – executive production
 Taron Egerton – vocals 
 Kit Connor – vocals 
 Sebastian Rich – vocals 
 Gemma Jones – vocals 
 Bryce Dallas Howard – vocals 
 Steven Mackintosh – vocals 
 Rachel Muldoon – vocals 
 Richard Madden – vocals 
 Celinde Schoenmaker – vocals 
 Jamie Bell – vocals

Charts

Weekly charts

Year-end charts

Certifications

References

Albums produced by Elton John
The Rocket Record Company compilation albums
Universal Music Group compilation albums
Virgin EMI Records albums
Interscope Records soundtracks
2019 soundtrack albums